Gerta von Ubisch (born 3 October 1882 in Metz, died 1965) was a German physicist, geneticist, and botanist.  She studied barley and found a genetic explanation for heterostyly. In 1933 she lost her position at Heidelberg University because of her Jewish heritage.

She had a brother, zoologist Leopold von Ubisch (1886–1965).

References 

1882 births
1965 deaths
20th-century German botanists
German geneticists
20th-century German physicists
German women physicists
Academic staff of Heidelberg University